Charouine District is a district of Timimoun Province, Algeria. According to the 2008 census it has a population of 31,149.

Communes
The district is further divided into 3 communes:
Charouine
Ouled Aissa
Talmine

References

Districts of Adrar Province